This is a list of U.S. counties and county equivalents with a gross domestic product over US$50 billion as of 2021.

2021 list

New York County is coterminous with the Borough of Manhattan, and is part of the City of New York, along with Kings County (Brooklyn), Queens County (Queens), Bronx County (The Bronx), and Richmond County (Staten Island). The figure shown here is for New York County/Manhattan, and does not include the other four boroughs' GDP.

Philadelphia and San Francisco are consolidated city-counties.

The District of Columbia is a federal district, meaning it is not under any traditional city, county, or state government.

2020 census

References

Economy of the United States-related lists
GDP
United States demography-related lists